The Route Nationale 52 is a French trunk road (Route nationale) between Marange-Silvange and Aubange (Belgium). This road is a dual carriageway between Rombas and Fameck and between Crusnes and Aubange (Belgium), but it is also a two-way road between Marange-Silvange and Rombas and formerly between Metz and Marange-Silvange and between Fameck and Crusnes. This road has an essential place in the Pays Haut (north of Meurthe-et-Moselle) as it serves as an essential access to the cities of Longwy in the northwest and Thionville and Metz in the southeast.

Junctions (Rombas to Fameck)

Junctions (Crusnes to Aubange)

External links
 N52 Highway on Saratlas

52